Yakhromskaya is a projected station of the Line 10 (Lyublinsko-Dmitrovskaya) of Moscow Metro in the far north of Moscow, Russia. It was previously known as Ulitsa 800-letiya Moskvy ("800th anniversary of Moscow Street"). The opening is scheduled for September 2023 together with Lianozovo and Fiztekh stations to the north. Yakhromskaya will be a column two-span shallow station with one island platform.

Location 
Yakromskaya station would be located under Dmitrovskoye Highway Initially, the station was supposed to be built south of the intersection of Dmitrovskoye Highway and 800th Anniversary of Moscow St., but because of the cancellation of Dmitrovskoye Shosse station, now it is planned to build Yakromskaya north of this intersection, between 800th Anniversary Street and Yakhromsky Drive.

References 

Moscow Metro stations
Lyublinsko-Dmitrovskaya Line
Railway stations located underground in Russia
Railway stations under construction in Russia